Colombia competed at the 1972 Summer Olympics in Munich, West Germany. 59 competitors, 55 men and 4 women, took part in 39 events in 8 sports.

Medalists

Silver
 Helmut Bellingrodt — Shooting, Men's Running Game Target

Bronze
 Clemente Rojas — Boxing, Men's Featherweight
 Alfonso Pérez — Boxing, Men's Lightweight

Athletics

Boxing

Men's Light Flyweight (– 48 kg)
Prudencio Cardona 
 First Round — Lost to Rafael Carbonell (CUB), 0:5

Men's Flyweight (– 51 kg)
Calixto Pérez
 First Round — Bye 
 Second Round — Defeated Martin Vargas (CHL), 5:0
 Third Round — Defeated Tim Dement (USA), 5:0
 Quarterfinals — Lost to Georgi Kostadinov (BUL), 2:3

Men's Light Middleweight (– 71 kg)
Bonifacio Avila
 First Round — Bye 
 Second Round — Lost to Dieter Kottysch (FRG), TKO-2

Cycling

Ten cyclists represented Colombia in 1972.

Individual road race
 Miguel Samacá — 9th place
 Fernando Cruz — 26th place
 Juan Morales — 66th place
 Fabio Acevedo — did not finish (→ no ranking)

Team time trial
 Fabio Acevedo
 Fernando Cruz
 Henry Cuevas
 Miguel Samacá

Sprint
 Jairo Díaz
 Carlos Galeano

1000m time trial
 Jairo Rodríguez
 Final — 1:10.86 (→ 23rd place)

Tandem
 Jairo Díaz and Rafael Narváez → 14th place

Individual pursuit
 Luis Díaz

Diving

Men's 3m Springboard
 Salim Barjum — 310.86 points (→ 26th place)

Men's 10m Platform
 Diego Henao — 264.27 points (→ 26th place)

Football

Men's Team Competition
Preliminary Round (Group D)
 Defeated  (3-1) → did not advance, 10th place over-all
Team Roster
 Armando Acosta
 Henry Caicedo
 Álvaro Calle
 Ernesto Díaz
 Fabio Espinosa
 Domingo González
 Dumas Guette
 Carlos Lugo
 Gerardo Moncada
 Luis Montano
 Jaime Morón
 Willington Ortiz
 Silvio Quintero
 Vicente Revellón
 Rafael Reyes
 Antonio Rivas
 Orlando Rivas
 Álvaro Santamaría
 Ángel Torres

Shooting

Ten male shooters represented Colombia in 1972.

25 m pistol
 Luis Colina
 Guillermo Martínez

50 m pistol
 Gilberto Fernández
 Jorge Henao

50 m rifle, three positions
 Jaime Callejas
 Alfonso Rodríguez

50 m rifle, prone
 Alfonso Rodríguez
 Jaime Callejas

50 m running target
 Helmut Bellingrodt
 Hanspeter Bellingrodt

Skeet
 Gerardo González
 Manuel González

Swimming

Weightlifting

See also
Sports in Colombia

References

External links
Official Olympic Reports
International Olympic Committee results database

Nations at the 1972 Summer Olympics
1972 Summer Olympics
1972 in Colombian sport